American country music band Pirates of the Mississippi has released six studio albums, one compilation album, and fourteen singles. Nine of their singles entered the Billboard Hot Country Songs charts. Their 1990 self-titled debut accounted for four chart entries including their most successful, 1991's "Feed Jake" at number 15. Their second-highest chart entry is 1992's "Til I'm Holding You Again" at number 22.

Albums

Singles

Music videos

References

Country music discographies
Discographies of American artists